Matthew Kennedy (born 4 February 1970) is a former Australian rules footballer who played in the Australian Football League (AFL).

Early life
Kennedy grew up on the Gold Coast where he played junior football for both Surfers Paradise and Southport. He is the son of former St Kilda player Des Kennedy.

AFL career
Kennedy played during the 1990s and early 2000s for both the Brisbane Bears and the Brisbane Lions after the Bears merged with Fitzroy in 1996. After 188 games of league football, which included the 2001 preliminary final, he retired at the end of the 2001 season, the year Brisbane won the first of their three consecutive flags.

References

Holmesby, Russell and Main, Jim (2007). The Encyclopedia of AFL Footballers. 7th ed. Melbourne: Bas Publishing.

1970 births
Living people
Brisbane Bears players
Brisbane Lions players
Southport Australian Football Club players
Sportspeople from the Gold Coast, Queensland
Australian rules footballers from Queensland
Allies State of Origin players